Eulepidotis geminata is a moth of the family Erebidae first described by Alpheus Spring Packard in 1869. It is found in the Neotropics, including Ecuador.

References

Moths described in 1869
geminata